Admiral Lyons may refer to:

Algernon Lyons (1833–1908), British Royal Navy admiral
Edmund Lyons, 1st Baron Lyons (1790–1858), British Royal Navy admiral
James Lyons (admiral) (1927–2018), U.S. Navy admiral

See also
Richard Lyon (naval officer) (1923–2017), U.S. Navy rear admiral
George Hamilton D'Oyly Lyon (1883–1947), British Royal Navy admiral